The 1995 World Marathon Cup was the sixth edition of the World Marathon Cup of athletics and were held in Athens, Greece.

Results

Men

Women

References

Results
IAAF/Ricoh World Cup  Men's Marathon results. Association of Road Racing Statisticians. Retrieved 2018-03-21.

World Marathon Cup
World Marathon Cup
Sports competitions in Athens
Marathons in Greece
World Marathon Cup
International athletics competitions hosted by Greece
Athletics in Athens